Tubal was a son of Japheth, son of Noah.

Tubal may also refer to:

 Tubal-cain, a figure in Genesis 4.
 Tubal (character), a character in The Merchant of Venice
 Tubal Rabbi Cain (born 1964), Nigerian writer
 Tubal Uriah Butler (1897-1977), Grenadian-born preacher and labour leader in Trinidad and Tobago
 Tubalar, a Turkic people in Siberia

See also
 Tabal
 Tuval

Masculine given names